Grimsargh is a civil parish in the City of Preston, Lancashire, England.  It contains six listed buildings that are recorded in the National Heritage List for England.  All of the listed buildings are designated at Grade II, the lowest of the three grades, which is applied to "buildings of national importance and special interest".  The parish contains the village of Grimsargh and surrounding countryside.  Four of the listed buildings are houses or farmhouses, and the others are a church, and a war memorial standing on a plinth dating possibly from the medieval era.

Buildings

References

Citations

Sources

Lists of listed buildings in Lancashire
Buildings and structures in the City of Preston